The 2020–21 Royal Charleroi Sporting Club season was the club's 117th season in existence and the 9th consecutive season in the top flight of Belgian football. In addition to the domestic league, Charleroi participated in this season's editions of the Belgian Cup and the UEFA Europa League. The season covered the period from 1 July 2020 to 30 June 2021.

Players

First-team squad

On loan

Pre-season and friendlies

Competitions

Overview

Belgian First Division A

League table

Results summary

Results by round

Matches
The league fixtures were announced on 8 July 2020.

Belgian Cup

UEFA Europa League

Statistics

Goalscorers

References

External links

R. Charleroi S.C. seasons
Charleroi
Charleroi